ClearFoundation is a Non-profit Incorporated Society that develops and manages the source code and repository of its flagship operating system namely ClearOS. The organization is headquartered in New Zealand

History 
The ClearFoundation is a New Zealand company which was created in 2009 with the purpose of developing and maintaining ClearOS under an open source model.

ClearFoundation Community 
The ClearFoundation community has over 103,100 members from more than 150 countries. Community members can earn recognition (badges) by participating in community projects, forums, and other tasks associated to ClearOS.

Projects

ClearOS Server 
ClearOS is an Open Source Linux Distribution based upon CentOS and Red Hat Enterprise Linux. Initially, the software was launched as ClarkConnect in 2002 and got its present name in 2009. Paid versions of ClearOS and the ClearOS Marketplace are developed and supported by ClearCenter. ClearOS is specifically designed for small and medium enterprises as a network gateway and network server with web-based administration interface.

References 

Linux companies
Software companies of New Zealand